Little Newsham is a village in County Durham, England. It is situated a few miles to the east of Barnard Castle.

References

Villages in County Durham